Uprising Records is a record label formed in 2004 by Matt Harvey and Evan Short of drum and bass band Concord Dawn. The label was originally created for releases by Concord Dawn, but has since made releases for several other drum and bass acts, including Australian band Pendulum and Norwegian duo Rawthang.

Artists 
The following artists have had at least one release with Uprising Records.
Bulletproof (2007–present)
Concord Dawn (2004–present)
Pacific (2006)
Pendulum (2004)
Rawthang (2005)
State of Mind (2006–present)

References 

Uprising Records - Releases. rolldabeats. Retrieved on 23 September 2008.
Uprising Records | Amplifier NZ Music. amplifier.co.nz. Retrieved on 23 September 2008.
Uprising Records | Music at music.net.nz. music.net.nz. Retrieved on 23 September 2008.

External links 
Uprising Records at Discogs

Drum and bass record labels
New Zealand record labels
Record labels established in 2004